Geraldine Fenton is a Canadian ice dancer. With partner William McLachlan, she is a three-time Canadian national champion and three-time World medallist.

Fenton retired from competition in 1959 in order to take a coaching position.

Competitive highlights
(with McLachlan)

References

 
 

Canadian female ice dancers
Year of birth missing (living people)
Living people
World Figure Skating Championships medalists